Siemianice  (German Schmaatz) is a village in the administrative district of Gmina Słupsk, within Słupsk County, Pomeranian Voivodeship, in northern Poland.

Before 1945 the area of Farther Pomerania, where the village is located,  was part of Germany. On March 8, 1945, the region was captured by the Red Army, and after the end of World War II it became part of Poland. The German inhabitants were expelled. For the history of the region, see History of Pomerania.

The village has a population of approximately 2,000.

References

Siemianice